Citronella moorei is a rainforest tree growing in eastern Australia. Common names for this species include churnwood, citronella, soapy box, silky beech, and corduroy.

Description
Citronella moorei is a large tree attaining a height of 50 metres and a diameter of 2 metres. The crown is dark green and dense. Easily identified in the rainforest by the extraordinary twisting and crooked trunk.

Bark, trunk and leaves
The bark is fawn or greyish, fissured and corky. The trunk is prominently and irregularly channelled, twisting or fluted. The trunk is rarely round except in very young trees. Often the trunk is leaning and crooked.

Branchlets moderately slender, green and smooth. Young shoots finely downy. Leaves are alternate and simple. 5 to 10 cm long, 4 to 6 cm broad. Leaves are not wavy edged, and drawn out to a blunt point. Old leaves turn black on the forest floor.

Venation is prominent on both surfaces. Midrib and four to six lateral veins raised, conspicuous and paler beneath.

Flowers, fruit and germination
Citronella moorei is dioecious, with male and female flowers on separate plants. Flowering period May to September. Creamy green flowers in narrow panicles.

The fruit is a black drupe, about 2 cm long. The outer part moist and fleshy, the inner part hard. Fruit ripe December to June. Eaten by green catbird, topknot pigeon and wompoo fruit dove.

Removal of the fleshy aril is advised. Germination of sown fresh seed is slow, beginning after about six months and being complete after 8 to 14 months yielding a 100% success rate.

Distribution and habitat

Growing on volcanic soils or rich alluvial soils in tropical, sub tropical and warm temperate rainforests. Common in sheltered valleys and slopes. It is found from the Clyde River, New South Wales (35° S) to Mossman, Queensland (16° S) in the tropics.

Timber and uses

Pale grey timber, close grained with conspicuous rays. Sapwood is susceptible to borers.

Gallery

References

 Floyd, A.G., Rainforest Trees of Mainland South-eastern Australia, Inkata Press 1989, 

Cardiopteridaceae
Asterids of Australia
Trees of Australia
Flora of New South Wales
Flora of Queensland
Dioecious plants